David S. Sheiner (born January 13, 1928) is an American actor. He appeared on Broadway, but is best known for his supporting roles in several films and television series. He started his career in television in 1952, but he was most successful from the 1960s through the 1980s.

Film and television roles
Sheiner appeared in several films including The Greatest Story Ever Told (1965) as James the Elder, They Call Me Mister Tibbs! (1970) and Blue Thunder (1983). He is probably best known for his supporting role as Roy, Oscar's accountant and poker playing crony  opposite  Jack Lemmon and Walter Matthau in the film adaptation of The Odd Couple (1968). Sheiner also featured prominently in the 1973 Michael Winner/Charles Bronson action movie "The Stone Killer".

Sheiner also guest-starred in many television programs. He appeared on two episodes of Combat!, as Captain Ridell in the third season episode "The Steeple" (1965) and as SS Major Krieghoffen in the fifth season episode "Gadjo" (1967). He also played roles on several other popular shows such as Columbo, The Big Valley, The Twilight Zone, The Invaders, The Man from U.N.C.L.E., Cannon, Hawaii Five-O, Blue Light, S.W.A.T., Quincy, M.E., Mission: Impossible, The Fall Guy, Vega$, Blind Ambition,  Planet of the Apes, Bonanza, and The Fugitive. He retired from acting in 1988.

Filmography

References

External links
 
 

1928 births
Living people
Male actors from New York City
American male film actors
American male television actors
20th-century American male actors